Roary the Racing Car is a British stop-motion children's television series created by David Jenkins and produced by Chapman Entertainment and Cosgrove Hall Films for Five and Nick Jr. It follows the adventures of Roary and his racing car friends at Silver Hatch race track.

Overview

Plot
The series follows the lives and adventures of five racing vehicles, Roary, Maxi, Cici/Zizzy, Drifter/Dragga, Tin Top, and the people who they work for, Big Chris the Mechanic, Marsha the Race Marshall and the owner of the racetrack, Mr. Carburettor.

Setting
Roary the Racing Car is set around a fictional motor racing circuit called Silver Hatch (a portmanteau of the names of the two British Grand Prix racing circuits, Silverstone and Brands Hatch). The majority of the action takes place at the track's pits and workshop, although we often follow the cars on their laps around the track. Occasionally, the characters venture to external locations such as the nearby beach. 

Sometimes, a race will happen, which will take up most of the episode.

Narration
Every story begins and ends with some brief narration normally from racing car driver Sir Stirling Moss, who is also used as a voiceover. The US version is narrated by American stock car driver Sam Hornish Jr.

Characters

Main
 Roary (voiced by Maria Darling) is a red British Formula Ford car who is the titular character of the show with the mindset of a schoolboy and a heart of gold. He has a healthy rivalry with Maxi and the two of them are often at odds frequently, but they do show that they care for each other and will often hang out together. Roary is only young and inexperienced at racing, but is constantly learning things from his friends and fellow racers. He sometimes gets into trouble over something, but he always makes up for it. He is very intelligent, friend to everyone around him and eager to learn. His best friend is Cici/Zizzy.
 Maxi (voiced by Marc Silk) is a yellow Italian Formula One car who is very hot-tempered and is obsessed with winning. He is very arrogant and snooty, often only thinking about himself. He is Mr. Carburettor's favourite race car at Silver Hatch and thinks very highly of himself. He has a healthy rivalry with Roary and the two of them often fight over who is the star car. He occasionally bullies and belittles Roary, but does show that he cares for him deep down. He is sometimes irresponsible and reckless, occasionally doing stunts that are harmful and risky. He loves to show off.
 Cici (Zizzy in North America) (voiced by Maria Darling) is a pink and purple French rally car who is very bubbly and friendly. She's also Roary's best friend and girlfriend.
 Drifter (Dragga in North America) (voiced by Marc Silk) is an orange Japanese drift car.
 Tin Top (voiced by Peter Kay in the UK and Kerry Shale in the US) is a dark blue American stock car who is very accident prone.
 Big Chris (voiced by Peter Kay in the UK and Kerry Shale in the US) is the mechanic of Silver Hatch who is slightly absent-minded.
 Marsha (voiced by Maria Darling) is the racing marshal of Silver Hatch. She waves the flag when the race begins, and also is the one who takes calls from her workstation.
 Mr. Antonio Carburettor (voiced by Tim Whitnall) is the flamboyant owner of Silver Hatch who speaks with an Italian accent. He loves singing opera.

Side

Vehicles
 Plugger (Lugga in North America) (voiced by Tim Whitnall) is an aqua blue Mitsubishi Triton L200 tow truck.
 FB (Trucksy in North America) (voiced by Dominic Frisby) is a green second generation Ford F-Series pickup truck who is Farmer Green's main vehicle.
 Zippee is an orange Vespa motor scooter who is Marsha's main vehicle.
 Rusty (voiced by Dominic Frisby) is an old caravan that Big Chris lives in.
 Breeze (voiced by Maria Darling) is a turquoise Meyers Manx buggy who lives at the beach and is Roary's second girlfriend.
 Hellie (voiced by Marc Silk) is a red, purple and yellow helicopter.
 Loada (voiced by Dominic Frisby) is a dark orange and light green race car transporter lorry that transports and delivers parcels to Silver Hatch. He speaks with an Eastern European accent.
 James (voiced by Dominic Frisby) is a silver Aston Martin DB5 convertible who is Mamma Mia's main vehicle.
 Nick (voiced by Marc Silk) is a blue and orange Lamborghini Gallardo police car who is the main vehicle of PC Pete.
 Conrod (voiced by Craig Lowndes) is a silver and red Australian Team Vodafone liveried Ford Falcon V8 Supercar. He speaks with an Australian accent.

Humans
 Farmer Green (voiced by Tim Whitnall) is a farmer who is very humble and slightly messy. The Silver Hatch racing crew often go to his farm to buy its products.
 PC Pete (Officer Pete in North America) (voiced by Dominic Frisby) is a police officer who is Marsha's brother.
 "Mamma" Mia Carburettor (voiced by Maria Darling) is Mr. Carburettor's mother. She is very prim and proper.
 Big Christine (voiced by Peter Kay in the UK and Kerry Shale in the US) is Big Chris' mother who loves dancing.
 "Copter" Keith (voiced by Marc Silk) is a helicopter mechanic/engineer and a good friend of Big Chris.

Animals
 Flash (Furzz in North America) (voiced by Marc Silk) is an anthropomorphic rabbit who likes to cause trouble on the racetrack.
 Molecom (voiced by Dominic Frisby) is an anthropomorphic mole who wears glasses. He is a skilled mechanic and banjo player.
 Dinkie (voiced by Marc Silk) is an old donkey who lives on Farmer Green's farm.

Production 
Roary the Racing Car uses a combination of computer-generated imagery and stop motion animation; the stop motion animation was initially provided by Cosgrove Hall Films, the producer of Noddy's Toyland Adventures, Engie Benjy, Little Robots, Fetch the Vet, the third to sixth Postman Pat series, Pocoyo, the original 1981 Danger Mouse series, Count Duckula, The Wind in the Willows and many other shows produced by this company, and latterly by Chapman Entertainment's own in-house studio, along with its sister show Fifi and the Flowertots. The series was created by David Jenkins, who spent four years working in senior management at Brands Hatch Race Circuit. The idea was conceived while watching the Grand Prix on television with his then-18-month-old son, Tom. It was designed and developed by Keith Chapman, creative director of Chapman Entertainment and the creator of Bob the Builder (both 1999 and the later 2015 series), Fifi and the Flowertots, and later, PAW Patrol and Mighty Express, and the series' executive producer is Greg Lynn. When the show came to the US, HIT Entertainment took the distribution rights, along with Fifi and the Flowertots. The theme music was produced by Alan Coates and Kim Goody.

Episodes

Series 1 (2007)

Series 2 (2008)

Series 3 (2009)

Series 4 (2010)

References

External links
 Roary the Racing Car official site with many games, activities and more
 

2007 British television series debuts
2010 British television series endings
2000s British children's television series
2010s British children's television series
2000s preschool education television series
2010s preschool education television series
Animated preschool education television series
Animated television series about auto racing
British children's animated comedy television series
British children's animated sports television series
British preschool education television series
British stop-motion animated television series
Channel 5 (British TV channel) original programming
DreamWorks Classics
English-language television shows
Fictional racing cars
Nick Jr. original programming
Television series by Cosgrove Hall Films
Television series by Mattel Creations
Television series by Universal Television
Treehouse TV original programming